Alexandru Marian Bănuţă (born 13 August 1986) is a Romanian former professional footballer who played as a midfielder.

Career
Bănuţă was born in Bucharest, Romania.

He played on the professional level in the Romanian Liga I for FC Ceahlăul Piatra Neamţ.

Personal life
His father George Banuta was also a footballer who migrated to France. Banuta's sister Anne Marie plays for Saint-Étienne. He also holds French citizenship.

References

External links
 
 Profile at foot31.fr 

1986 births
Living people
Association football forwards
Romanian footballers
CSM Ceahlăul Piatra Neamț players
JS Saint-Pierroise players
ASC Daco-Getica București players
Angoulême Charente FC players
SS Saint-Louisienne players
Canet Roussillon FC players
Liga I players
Liga II players
Romanian expatriate footballers
Expatriate footballers in France
Romanian expatriate sportspeople in France
Expatriate footballers in Réunion